"Stationary Bike" is a short story by the American writer Stephen King, originally published in the fifth edition of From the Borderlands in 2003. In 2008, it was republished in King's collection Just After Sunset.

Film adaptation
In 2012, the film production company Gwynplaine Films and its associates adapted the story into a short film, Bike. The film starred Stephen Hope-Wynne, an independent cinema and TV veteran.

In 2019 The Blaenau Gwent Film Academy produced a short film adapted from the story

Audiobook
An audiobook version, read by Ron McLarty, was adapted from Stephen King's work "Stationary Bike" and released on CD in June 2006.

See also

Short fiction by Stephen King

References

External links
 King's official site
 "Stationary Bike" at King's official site

2003 short stories
Horror short stories
Short stories adapted into films
Short stories by Stephen King
Physical fitness in popular culture